Dwellin' in tha Labb is the third solo full-length album by American rapper and producer JT the Bigga Figga from San Francisco. It was released on October 10, 1995 through Get Low Recordz and Straight Out Tha Labb Entertainment with distribution by Priority Records. The album features guest appearances from 11/5, Andre "Herm" Lewis, Black C, Celly Cel, Cougnut, E-40, Get Low Playaz, Mac Mall, Master P, Pizzo, San Quinn, Seff tha Gaffla, The Delinquents, The Link Crew and Trev-G.

The album peaked at number 168 on the Billboard 200, at number 24 on the Top R&B/Hip-Hop Albums and at number 9 on the Heatseekers Albums in the United States, making it JT's most successful project to date. Its lead single, a self-titled track "Dwellin' in the Lab", made it to number 39 on the Hot Rap Songs chart.

It was re-released in 2000 via Get Low Recordz and in 2006 via SMC Recordings.

Track listing

Charts

References

External links

1994 albums
JT the Bigga Figga albums